Laugar Junior College ( or ) is an Icelandic boarding school, founded in 1925. It is located in the north of Iceland, near the towns of Húsavík and Akureyri.

External links
 Vefsíða skólans
 Vefsíða nemendafélagsins

Secondary schools in Iceland
Educational institutions established in 1925
1925 establishments in Iceland